Stewart Cole (Doc) Bowers (February 26, 1915 – December 14, 2005) was a pitcher who played in Major League Baseball from  through . Bowers was a switch hitter and threw right-handed. He was born in New Freedom, Pennsylvania.

Bowers played at Gettysburg College before being signed by the Boston Red Sox. He reached the majors in 1935 with the Red Sox and pitched 15 games for them between 1935 and 1936. He posted a 2–1 record with a 4.60 ERA and five strikeouts in 29 ⅓ innings, including two starts and one complete game. He also had a single appearance in 1937 as a pinch runner.
 
Following his baseball career, Bowers served in the United States Army during World War II and later worked for American Insulator Company and for Ford Motor Company. On March 28, 1944, he enlisted in the army. Bowers died in Havertown, Pennsylvania, at the age of 90.

References

External links

Historic Baseball

1915 births
2005 deaths
Boston Red Sox players
Major League Baseball pitchers
Baseball players from Pennsylvania
Gettysburg Bullets baseball players
People from New Freedom, Pennsylvania
United States Army personnel of World War II